Shefford is a township municipality located in the province of Quebec. It is part of the Haute-Yamaska Regional County Municipality in the administrative area of Estrie. The population as of the Canada 2021 Census was 7,253. The township completely encircles the city of Waterloo.

Demographics 

Population trend:

Mother tongue language (2006)

See also
List of township municipalities in Quebec

References

External links

Township municipalities in Quebec
Incorporated places in La Haute-Yamaska Regional County Municipality